Odell is a township in Coös County, New Hampshire, United States. The 2020 census recorded one person living in the township.

In New Hampshire, locations, grants, townships (which are different from towns), and purchases are unincorporated portions of a county which are not part of any town and have limited self-government (if any, as many are uninhabited).

History 
The township takes its name from Richard Odell of Conway, who bought  from the state in 1834 for $1,863.

Geography 
Odell is bounded to the west by Stratford, to the south by Stark, to the east by Dummer and Millsfield, and to the north by Erving's Location and Columbia.

A substantial portion of the state-owned Nash Stream Forest lies within the township. There are only a few rough roads and no highways here.

The west side of the township drains to Nash Stream, while the east side drains to Phillips Brook. Both are south-flowing tributaries of the Upper Ammonoosuc River and part of the Connecticut River watershed.

Demographics 

As of the 2000 census, there were 5 people, 4 households, and 1 family residing in the township.  There were 73 housing units at an average density of 1.6 per square mile (0.6/km).  The racial makeup of the township was 100.00% White.

There were 4 households, out of which 1 was a married couple living together and 3 were non-families. 3 households were made up of individuals, and 2 had someone living alone who was 65 years of age or older.  The average household size was 1.25 and the average family size was 2.00.

In the township the population was spread out, with 1 person from 18 to 24, 1 person from 25 to 44, 1 person from 45 to 64, and 2 people who were 65 years of age or older.  The median age was 50 years.  For every 100 females, there were 66.7 males.  For every 100 females age 18 and over, there were 66.7 males.

References

Townships in Coös County, New Hampshire
Berlin, New Hampshire micropolitan area
Townships in New Hampshire